Syamadas Mukhopadhyaya (22 June 1866 – 8 May 1937) was an Indian mathematician who introduced the four-vertex theorem and Mukhopadhyaya's theorem in plane geometry.

Biography 
Syamadas Mukhopadhyaya was born at Haripal, Hooghly district, in the West Bengal, India. He graduated from Hooghly College, received his M.A. degree from Presidency College in Calcutta, and his Ph.D. degree from Calcutta University in 1910. He also took classes from the Indian Association for the Cultivation of Science.

Mukhopadhyaya was appointed by Asustosh Mookerjee as professor of mathematics in the Rajabazar Science College, University of Calcutta. Jacques Hadamard communicated with Mukhopadyaya about the latter's work on the geometry of a plane arc and Wilhelm Blaschke's book on geometry had a reference to Mukhopadhyaya.

He worked at Bangabasi College and then at Bethune College in Calcutta, where he lectured in Mathematics, English Literature, and Philosophy. In 1932, he was elected president of the Calcutta Mathematical Society. He served in this capacity until his death from heart failure in 1937. Mukhopadhyaya went to Europe on a Ghose Travelling Fellowship in 1933 to study methods of education. He gave lectures in Paris University.

References

 "Syamadas Mukhopadhyaya", Bulletin of the Calcutta Mathematical Society, Vol. 29 (1937), pages 115-120. 
 D. DeTurck, H. Gluck, D. Pomerleano, D.S. Vick, The four vertex theorem and its converse, Notices of the AMS, 54 (2007), no. 2, 192–207.

Differential geometers
19th-century Indian mathematicians
20th-century Indian mathematicians
University of Calcutta alumni
Academic staff of the University of Calcutta
Scientists from Kolkata
1937 deaths
1866 births